1100 Superior (formerly known as the Diamond Shamrock Building, the Diamond Building, and Oswald Centre) is a skyscraper in downtown Cleveland, Ohio's emerging Nine-Twelve District, which is also home to One Cleveland Center, Ohio Savings Plaza, The 925 Building, PNC Center, and the former Eaton Center. It was designed by the firm of Skidmore, Owings and Merrill which also designed the nearby AECOM Building, and the Willis Tower in Chicago, Illinois. The firm was a leader in the modernist tower block design at the time of construction which believed in three principals: heavy metal anchoring, profuse windows for air and light, and simple muted dark colored facade paneling that gave their landmark buildings a "natural"  organic look.

It is located at 1100 Superior Avenue along East 12th Street. In 1994, during a water main break, a four-story section of the Diamond Building lost some of its glass from pressure of the water. In 2012, the tower's naming rights were purchased by insurance brokerage the Oswald Cos. (which is written in bright red multistory letters on the north and south sides of the tower), one of its largest tenants.

See also
List of tallest buildings in Cleveland

References

External links

Office buildings completed in 1972
Modernist architecture in Ohio
Skidmore, Owings & Merrill buildings
Skyscraper office buildings in Cleveland